Nannopterum is a genus of cormorant comprising three species. They are found throughout the Americas, hence the common name American cormorants.

These species were formerly classified in the genus Phalacrocorax. A molecular phylogenetic study of the cormorants published in 2014 found that these three species formed a clade that was sister to the genus Leucocarbo. To create monophyletic genera, the three species were moved the resurrected genus Nannopterum that had been introduced in 1899 by English ornithologist Richard Bowdler Sharpe to accommodate the flightless cormorant. The genus Nannopterum is thought to have split from Leucocarbo between 6.7 - 8.0 million years ago.

The genus name Nannopterum combines the Ancient Greek nannos meaning "dwarf" with pteron meaning "wing". This name was coined for the flightless cormorant, which does indeed have small wings. Genetic studies have found that the neotropic and double-crested cormorants form a clade with the flightless cormorant, and they are thus placed together in the genus Nannopterum despite both species having normal-sized wings and full flight capabilities.

List of species

References 

 
Bird genera
Taxa named by Richard Bowdler Sharpe